Ruth 1 is the first chapter of the Book of Ruth in the Hebrew Bible or the Old Testament of the Christian Bible, part of the Ketuvim ("Writings"). This chapter contains the story of how Elimelech, Ruth's father-in-law, driven by famine, moved into Moab, and died there (Ruth 1:1-5); Naomi returning home, Ruth accompanies her (Ruth 1:6-18); They came to Bethlehem (Ruth 1:19-22).

Text
The original text was written in Hebrew language. This chapter is divided into 22 verses.

Textual versions
Some early witnesses for the text of this chapter in Hebrew are of the Masoretic Text, which includes the Aleppo Codex (10th century) and Codex Leningradensis (1008). Some fragments containing parts of this chapter were found among the Dead Sea Scrolls, i.e., 4Q104 (4QRutha; ca. 50 BCE) with extant verses 1–12, and 4Q105 (4QRuthb; 30 BCE-68 CE) with extant verses 1‑6, 12‑15, with only slight variations from the Masoretic Text.

There is also a translation into Koine Greek known as the Septuagint, made in the last few centuries BC. Extant ancient manuscripts of the Septuagint version include Codex Vaticanus (B; B; 4th century), Codex Alexandrinus (A; A; 5th century).

The Bethlehem Trilogy
Three sections of the Hebrew Bible (Old Testament) — Judges 17–18, Judges 19–21, Ruth 1–4 — form a trilogy with a link to the city Bethlehem of Judah and characterized by the repetitive unique statement:
"In those days there was no king in Israel; everyone did what was right in his own eyes"
(Judges 17:6; 18:1; 19:1; 21:25; cf. Ruth 1:1)
as in the following chart:

Verse 1

 Now it came to pass, in the days when the judges ruled, that there was a famine in the land. And a certain man of Bethlehem, Judah, went to dwell in the country of Moab, he and his wife and his two sons.
 "Now it came to pass" (Hebrew ויהי ): literally, "And it came to pass." The "And" (Hebrew: , w[a]) is a remarkable opening of the book, which is also found in the first word of the Book of Exodus, Leviticus, Numbers, Joshua, Judges, 1 and 2 Samuel, 1 and 2 Kings, 2 Chronicles, Ezekiel, Esther, and Ezra; all these books, including Ezekiel, are historical.
 "In the days when the judges ruled": literally, "when the judges judged". The narratives in this book took place in the early times of the judges, although the precise date cannot be determined. The genealogy  points to the time of David as the earliest when the Book of Ruth could have been written. Josephus places it during the time of Eli as the high priest, but that is too late for Boaz, the grandfather of Jesse, the father of David, to live. Some Jewish writers, as rabbi Jarchi, place it during the time of Ibzan, who they identify as Boaz, but with no evidence, and also too late for the events. The Jewish chronology put it during the time of Eglon, king of Moab, when Ehud was judge; Lightfoot concurs and place it between the third and fourth chapters of Judges, during the times of Ehud or Shamgar. Junius refers it to the times of Deborah and Barak; and others, on account of the famine, think it began in the period when the Midianites oppressed Israel, taking away the fruits of the earth, thus when Gideon was called to be a judge.
 "And a certain man" (Hebrew: איש 'îsh): The  word "certain" is added for clarity, as the original simply reads "And a man".
 "Bethlehem, Judah": not Bethlehem in the tribe of Zebulun, . The name denotes the fruitfulness of the place, and the plenty of bread ("Beth-lehem" means "house-(of)-bread").
"Dwell" (KJV: "sojourn"): as a resident alien.
 "The country of Moab" (Hebrew: שדי מואב sadeh Moab): Here, and in Ruth 1:2, ; Ruth 4:3, literally, "the field" or "fields of Moab." The same word sadeh is used of the territory of Moab, the Amalekites, Edom, and the Philistines, showing a consistent reference to a foreign country, not the country of the writer.

Verse 2
The name of the man was Elimelech, the name of his wife was Naomi, and the names of his two sons were Mahlon and Chilion—Ephrathites of Bethlehem, Judah. And they went to the country of Moab and remained there.
 "Elimelech": means "God is King," was interpreted as, "My God is King." although the intermediate "i" (after "El") is not the possessive pronoun, but the vowel of union. The name would be originally significant of strong religious sentiments, perhaps mingled with strong political principles. The imposition of it on a son would be something like a manifesto of the father's creed.
 "Naomi": or "No-o-mi," could be an abbreviated name that means "God is sweet," or, very literally, "Jah is sweetness." It had been originally imposed as a name by some grateful and happy mother, who, by gracious providences, or by other gracious revelations, had been led to think that "sweet are the ways, sweet are the dealings, and sweet is the character of God." The word does not mean "beautiful" nor "gracious" nor "my delight", as others suppose. It was not intended to describe the character of the person who was to bear the name, but intended to signalize, in the spirit of a manifesto, a much-prized feature in the Divine character - that feature, namely, that is displayed when "he deals sweetly with men." Gesenius is doubtless right when he makes sweetness the fundamental idea of the whole group of affiliated words (see his 'Thesaurus,' in voc.). In the light of this interpretation alone, can the full significance of what Naomi said on her return to Bethlehem be understood: "Do not call me Naomi; call me Mara, for the Almighty has dealt very bitterly with me" (verse 20).
 "Mahlon" (or rather "Machlon,") "and Chillon": The names, unlike those of the parents, are devoid of theological tinge, that the first one meant "sickliness", and the other "consumptiveness", or "consumption" - rather uninteresting and melancholy ideas. But they are peculiarly confounding when those men had apparently inherited a delicate constitution, which developed in both of them into premature "sickliness and decay", being perhaps "weakly and consumptive persons"; and it appears they both died young. After the death of their father, the two sons married Moabite women which according to Jewish writers was a violation of the Mosaic law, so that the early deaths of both the young men were divine judgments inflicted on them for those unlawful connections. One Jewish tradition, mentioned by Aben Ezra, identifies with "Joash and Saraph", who are said to have dominion in Moab,  which is not likely.
 "Ephrathites": that is, "Bethlehemites", for the old name of "Bethlehem" was "Ephrath", or "Ephratha". However, as the word "Ephrathite" also meant "Ephraimite" (see ; ; and ), it gave precision to the designation, although a little redundant, to say "Ephrathites of Bethlehem Judah."
 "And continued there" (Hebrew: ויהיו־שם wa-yih-yū-sham): The original phrase is simply "and were there."

Verse 3
 And Elimelech Naomi's husband died;
 and she was left, and her two sons.
 "Died": According to Josephus, after he had dwelt in the land ten years, and had married his two sons to Moab women, but Alshech believes from the text that while he was living they were not married to them, but after his death; and it is said of them only that they dwelt there for about ten years; so that it is most probable that their father died quickly after he came into the land of Moab: leaving Naomi and her two sons; in a strange land, she without a husband, and they without a father.
 "And she was left, and her two sons": The mother became her husband's "relict" and while he had passed away in advance, she and their two sons "remained."

Verse 4
 And they took them wives of the women of Moab;
 the name of the one was Orpah,
 and the name of the other Ruth:
 and they dwelled there about ten years.
 "They took them wives of the women of Moab": Marriages of Israelites with women of Ammon or Moab are nowhere in the Law expressly forbidden, as were marriages with the women of Canaan . In the days of Nehemiah the special law  was interpreted as forbidding them, and as excluding the children of such marriages from the congregation of Israel . Probably the marriages of Mahlon and Chilion would be justified by necessity, living as they were in a foreign land. Ruth was the wife of the older brother, Mahlon .

Verse 5
 And Mahlon and Chilion died also both of them;
 and the woman was left of her two sons and her husband.
 "And the woman was left of her two children and of her husband": That is, she "remained behind" or "she survived them".

Verse 6
 Then she arose with her daughters in law,
 that she might return from the country of Moab:
 for she had heard in the country of Moab
 how that the Lord had visited his people in giving them bread.
 "Her daughters-in-law": from Hebrew כַּלּתֶיהָ - literally "her brides," that is, "the brides of her sons".
 "That she might return" - The original phrase can be rendered as "and she returned," that is, "and she began to return."
 "That the Lord had visited his people in giving them bread": that he had been kind and gracious to the people of Israel, by granting them plenty of provisions; which might be their happy case after Gideon had vanquished the Midianites, who came yearly, and destroyed and carried off the fruits of the earth, which had caused a famine; see . It seems as if the famine had continued ten years, see Ruth 1:4 nor need this be thought incredible, since there was a famine in Lydia, which lasted eighteen years. Note that "Beth-lehem" means "house of bread."

Verse 16

 And Ruth said,
 Intreat me not to leave thee,
 or to return from following after thee:
 for whither thou goest, I will go;
 and where thou lodgest, I will lodge:
 thy people shall be my people, and thy God my God:
 "Wheresoever thou lodgest, I will lodge": A better version than Luther's, "Where thou stayest, I will stay" (wo du bleibest, da bleibe ich auch). It is the Latin pernoetare and the German ubernachten, the former being the rendering of the Vulgate, and the latter the translation in the Berlenburger Bibel.
 "Thy people (is) my people, and thy God my God": There being no verb in the original, it is well to supply the simplest copula. Ruth claims, as it were, Naomi's people and Naomi's God as her own already.
 "And thy God my God": not Chemosh, nor Baalpeor, nor other gods of the Moabites, be they what they will, but Jehovah, the God of Naomi, and of the people of Israel.

Verse 20
 But she said to them, "Do not call me Naomi; call me Mara, for the Almighty has dealt very bitterly with me."
 "Mara": means "bitter" (a contrast to her name "Naomi" that means "sweet" or "pleasant"), which reflects her current miseries.
 "The Almighty" - שׁדי shadday (see ). This name is almost unique to the Pentateuch and to the Book of Job. Otherwise, it is only found twice in the Psalms, and four times in the Prophets.

Verse 21
 "I went out full, and the Lord has brought me home again empty. Why do you call me Naomi, since the Lord has testified against me, and the Almighty has afflicted me?"
 "The Lord has testified against me" - The phrase is very commonly applied to someone giving witness concerning (usually against) another in a court of justice ; ; . In the bitterness of her spirit Naomi complains that the Lord Himself turned against her, bringing her sins up for judgment.

Verse 22
 So Naomi returned,
 and Ruth the Moabitess, her daughter in law, with her,
 which returned out of the country of Moab:
 and they came to Bethlehem in the beginning of barley harvest.
 "So Naomi returned": The narrator pauses to recapitulate the return narrative, using the word "and" of the original, which is translated into "so" in English.
 "And Ruth the Moabitess, her daughter-in-law, with her, who returned out of the land of Moab": The cumulative and apparently redundant expression, "who returned out of the land of Moab," is remarkable, at once for its simplicity and for its inexactitude. Ruth, strictly speaking, had not "returned", but she "took part in Naomi's return".
 "In the beginning of barley harvest" or "at the commencement of barley-harvest": Barley ripened before wheat, and began to be reaped sometimes as early as March, but generally in April (Hebrew month Abib). By the time that the barley-harvest was finished the wheat crop would be ready for the sickle. Barley was the first crop to be cut which, according to Josephus, began on the second day of the "feast of unleavened bread", on the "sixteenth" of Nisan (same as Abib; March or part of April in the Gregorian calendar), when they offered the sheaf of the firstfruits to the Lord, and then, and not till then, might they begin their harvest (see Gill on Leviticus 23:10; see Gill on Leviticus 23:14), hence the Targum here is,"they came to Bethlehem at the beginning of the day of the passover, and on that day the children of Israel began to reap the wave sheaf, which was of barley." So the Egyptians and Phoenicians, near neighbours of the Jews, went about cutting down their barley as soon as the cuckoo was heard, which was the same time of the year; hence the comedian calls that bird the king of Egypt and Phoenicia. This circumstance is observed for the sake of the following account in the next chapter. The offering of the wave-sheaf sanctified the whole harvest. At the same time, this feast had a typical character, and pre-intimated the resurrection of Christ, who rose from the dead on the very day the first-fruits were offered.

See also

Related Bible parts: Book of Judges, Books of Samuel, Matthew 2, Luke 2

Notes

References

Bibliography

External links

Jewish
Ruth 1 Hebrew with Parallel English
Ruth 1 Hebrew with Rashi's Commentary

Christian
Ruth 1 English Translation with Parallel Latin Vulgate

01